Kenneth Edward Miller (born June 24, 1958) is a former American football cornerback in the Canadian Football League for the Montreal Alouettes, Montreal Concordes, Ottawa Rough Riders and Calgary Stampeders. He played college football at Eastern Michigan University.

Early years
Miller attended Beecher High School, where he practiced football and track & field.

He accepted a football scholarship from Eastern Michigan University, where he became a two-year starter at cornerback. As a senior, he only played in four games because of an ankle injury. He registered one interception and returned 26 kickoffs for a 20.3-yard average in his college career.

Professional career

Dallas Cowboys
Miller was selected by the Dallas Cowboys in the seventh round (173rd overall) of the 1981 NFL Draft. He was limited with a back injury and was waived on August 25.

Montreal Alouettes / Concordes (CFL)
In September 1981, he signed with the Montreal Alouettes of the Canadian Football League. He played in 3 games during the season. In 1982, he returned to the renamed Concordes and played in 12 games as a starter at cornerback.

Ottawa Rough Riders (CFL)
In March 1983, he was signed by the Ottawa Rough Riders of the Canadian Football League and registered 2 interceptions. In 1984, he was a starter at cornerback and recorded a career-high 4 interceptions.

Chicago Bears
In 1985, he was signed as a free agent by the Chicago Bears. He was limited with a groin injury and was released on August 12.

Calgary Stampeders (CFL)
In August 1985, he signed with the Calgary Stampeders of the Canadian Football League.

References

External links
Ken Miller Stats

1958 births
Living people
Sportspeople from Pine Bluff, Arkansas
Players of American football from Arkansas
American football cornerbacks
Eastern Michigan Eagles football players
Montreal Alouettes players
Montreal Concordes players
Ottawa Rough Riders players
Calgary Stampeders players